List of Earth scientists may refer to:
List of geodesists
List of geographers
List of geologists
List of meteorologists
List of oceanographers
List of soil scientists

See also
 List of Russian Earth scientists

Earth scientistics